Ruslan Nuraliyevich Ashuraliyev (20 February 1950 – 27 November 2009) was a Russian freestyle wrestler who won world titles in 1974 and 1975 and placed second in 1973. He competed at the 1972 and 1976 Olympics and finished third and fourth, respectively.

Ashuraliyev took up wrestling in 1965 and later won five Soviet titles, in 1971, 1973–74 and 1976–77. After retiring from competitions he worked as a wrestling coach, and also served two terms in the parliament of Dagestan. From 2000 until his death in 2009, he headed the Dagestan Polytechnic Institute in Makhachkala.

References

1950 births
2009 deaths
Olympic wrestlers of the Soviet Union
Wrestlers at the 1972 Summer Olympics
Wrestlers at the 1976 Summer Olympics
Russian male sport wrestlers
Olympic bronze medalists for the Soviet Union
Olympic medalists in wrestling
Sportspeople from Makhachkala
Ossetian people
Medalists at the 1972 Summer Olympics
European Wrestling Champions
World Wrestling Championships medalists
20th-century Russian people